The 2012 Asian Indoor Athletics Championships was the fifth edition of the international indoor athletics event between Asian nations. It took place at the Vocational and Technical College Athletics Hall in Hangzhou, China, between 18 and 19 February. A total of 26 nations sent athletes to compete at the championships, which featured 25 track and field events.

China topped the medal table with 14 golds. Iran was second with three golds while Bahrain finished third with three golds.

The competition featured two Asian indoor records. Mutaz Essa Barshim broke the men's high jump record with a clearance of 2.37 m, bettering Zhu Jianhua's 26-year-ol standard. Li Ling beat the women's Asian indoor record in the pole vault with a mark of 4.50 m.

Results

Men

Women

Medal table

Participating nations
A total of 26 nations were represented by athletes competing at the 2012 championships

 (6)
 (63)
 (7)
 (7)
 (14)
 (3)
 (13)
 (1)
 (10)
 (15)
 (8)
 (7)
 (2)
 (6)
 (7)
 (2)
 (1)
 (3)
 (1)
 (4)
 (2)
 (1)
 (2)
 (5)
 (2)
 (3)

References

 Results Book. Asian Athletics Association (2012) - archived. Retrieved on 2014-02-17.

External links
Asian Athletics Association

Indoor 2012
Asian Indoor Championships
Asian Indoor Championships
Indoor Championships
Sport in Hangzhou
International athletics competitions hosted by China